Schistidium poeltii is a species of moss found in the Arctic. It is native to northern regions of Europe (Finland, Sweden, Norway), Greenland, and north-eastern Canada by sea.

References

Grimmiales
Flora of the Arctic
Endangered plants
Plants described in 1996